War in the Land of Egypt or The Egyptian Citizen (translit.Al-Moaten Masry) is a 1991 Egyptian drama film directed by Salah Abu Seif, and starting Omar Sharif. It is based on the 1978 novel of the same name by Yusuf al-Qa'id. The film was entered into the 17th Moscow International Film Festival.

Synopsis
A mayor (Omar Sharif) has many children, and when his youngest son is drafted to serve in the Yom Kippur War of 1973, the family patriarch trades two acres of land to a simple farmer (Ezzat El Alaili) in exchange for the latter’s son to serve in the privileged scion’s place. The situation is complicated when the mayor wins a case against the Land Registry, resulting in an order evicting the farmer from their land in favor of the mayor’s ownership. The farmer forges the title to new land after paying a bribe, but his son ultimately dies in combat, leading to deep regrets over how the money was earned. The duplicity is contrasted with the general solidarity between citizens and soldiers in the war.

Cast
 Omar Sharif
 Ezzat El Alaili
 Safia El Emari
 Abdullah Mahmoud
 Khaled El Nabawy
 Ashraf Abdel Baqi

References

External links
 
 El Cinema page
 Kinopoisk page
 El Film page (archived)
 Turner Classic Movies page
 All Movie page

1991 films
1991 drama films
Egyptian drama films
1990s Arabic-language films
Films directed by Salah Abu Seif